Ondrej Daňko (born 26 May 1948 in Czechoslovakia) is a former Slovak football midfielder who played only for VSS Košice from 1967 to 1981. Daňko played overall 313 matches and scored 56 goals at the Czechoslovak First League. He was a part of the legendary VSS midfield from the 1970s, including trio Štafura – Daňko – Pollák.

He won Slovak Cup in 1973 and 1980.

Daňko made two appearances for the Czechoslovakia national football team.

External links

1948 births
Living people
Slovak footballers
Czechoslovak footballers
Czechoslovakia international footballers
FC VSS Košice players
Slovak football managers
FC VSS Košice managers
1. FC Tatran Prešov managers
Association football midfielders